HMNZS Matai (T01) was a Marine Department lighthouse tender which was requisitioned by the Royal New Zealand Navy (RNZN) and converted into a minesweeper.

Operational history
Matai was the government's lighthouse tender servicing the marine lights around New Zealand and offshore islands, and had been used for cable laying in the 1930s. She was named after a native tree.

She was requisitioned on 3 March 1941 and handed over to a dockyard for conversion.

After commissioning on 1 April 1941, Matai took over as the flotilla leader of the 25th Minesweeping Flotilla from Muritai and the flotilla began clearing a German minefield in the Hauraki Gulf.

See also
Minesweepers of the Royal New Zealand Navy

References
 McDougall, R J  (1989) New Zealand Naval Vessels. Page 69–78. Government Printing Office.

Further reading
 Harker, Jack (2000)The Rockies: New Zealand Minesweepers at War. Silver Owl Press. 

Minesweepers of the Royal New Zealand Navy
Lighthouse tenders of New Zealand
1930 ships